333 is an audio and video album released by Green Jellÿ in 1994.

Only 200,000 copies of the album were printed and only 5,000 copies of the video. The album failed to chart, and both versions are very difficult to find today.

A long-form video for the album was never properly released, and thus is extremely difficult to find. Despite this, the new video album did receive a 1995 Grammy nomination for best long-form video.

Track listing

In popular culture
 "The Bear Song" was featured in the movie Dumb and Dumber.
 "Carnage Rules" was used as the theme song of the 1994 Spider-Man videogame Spider-Man and Venom: Maximum Carnage; the song itself is based on the Marvel Comics character Carnage.
 Former member Maynard James Keenan appears as "Billy Bob" in the "Slave Boy" video.
 Renowned parody musician, and future Volcano Records labelmate "Weird Al" Yankovic, makes a cameo in the music video for "Anthem" along with KISS members Gene Simmons and Paul Stanley.

References

1994 albums
Green Jellÿ albums
Zoo Entertainment (record label) albums